Mala Loka pri Višnji Gori is a settlement in the Municipality of Grosuplje in central Slovenia. It lies southwest of Višnja Gora in the historical region of Lower Carniola. The municipality is now included in the Central Slovenia Statistical Region.

Name
The name of the settlement was changed from Mala Loka to Mala Loka pri Višnji Gori in 1953. In the past the German name was Kleinlack.

Chapel

A small chapel in the northern part of the settlement is dedicated to Our Lady of Sorrows and was built in the late 19th century.

References

External links

Mala Loka pri Višnji Gori on Geopedia

Populated places in the Municipality of Grosuplje